Orlivka (Romanian: Cartal) is a selo (village) in  Reni raion in the southern Ukrainian oblast of Odesa.

Location

History 
Around 2nd century BC, a Celtic tribe settled the area and founded the town of Aliobrix. Later, from 1st to 3rd centuries AD, the site was further expanded by Romans who built the fortress nearby.

Later and until 1948 it was known as Cartal.

Infrastructure
Through the village passes highway Odesa–Reni, while on the banks of the Danube the Orlivka – Isaccea Ferry service was built in 2019. Portions of the Odesa–Reni Highway between Reni and Orlivka follow a narrow strip between Lake Cahul and the Danube.

References

Celtic towns
Roman towns and cities in Ukraine
Villages in Izmail Raion
Reni Hromada